Diary of a Country Priest is a 1951 French drama film written and directed by Robert Bresson, and starring Claude Laydu in his debut film performance. A faithful adaptation of Georges Bernanos' novel of the same name, which had won the Grand prix du roman de l'Académie française in 1936, it tells the story of a sickly young Catholic priest who has been assigned a small village in northern France as his first parish. The film was lauded for Laydu's performance, which has been called one of the greatest in the history of cinema, and won numerous awards, including the Grand Prize at the Venice International Film Festival and the Prix Louis Delluc.

Plot
In the small village of Ambricourt, the new parish priest keeps a diary, which he can be seen writing in and heard reading from throughout the film. Due to an undiagnosed stomach ailment, he has excluded meat and vegetables from his diet and primarily subsists on cheap wine with sugar and bread added. The locals are mostly either indifferent or hostile to the young priest, whether it be an old man who complains about the fees to bury his wife or the students of the catechism class who play tricks, so, as this is his first appointment, he often consults with the older and more experienced Priest of Torcy, who says he needs to worry about keeping order, rather than being loved.

The only parishioner who attends daily mass is Miss Louise, the young governess at the local manor, who is secretly having an affair with the Count. She complains that her ward, Chantal, mistreats her, so the priest says he will go talk to the Count, who he has been looking for an excuse to see about getting help starting a youth club and sports program. The Count initially approves of the priest's plans, but cools when the priest attempts to broach the subject of the conflict between Chantal and Louise.

When the priest revisits the manor, the Count avoids him, so he is greeted by the Countess, who withdrew from the world when Chantal's younger brother died several years ago, but he soon begins to feel ill and leaves. He goes to see Dr. Delbende, an elderly physician with a struggling practice who, though an atheist, is friends with and was recommended by the Priest of Torcy. The doctor palpates the priest's abdomen at length, but offers no diagnosis.

The priest finds it difficult to pray, even when he is able to find the time to try. One day, he receives an anonymous letter in Louise's handwriting telling him to ask to be transferred to another parish. He becomes convinced that God has abandoned him, and is particularly affected by the death of Dr. Delbende, which is rumored to be a suicide, but decides he has not lost his faith.

Chantal tells the priest that the Count and Louise plan to send her away and the Countess is not trying to stop them. The priest worries Chantal may be suicidal and, on a hunch, asks her to hand over her suicide note, which she produces from her pocket. Concerned, he goes to see the Countess, and, overheard by Chantal, they have a contentious theological conversation, by the end of which the Countess has come to terms with the death of her son and reconciled with God. She dies that night of a heart condition, and Louise leaves the manor shortly thereafter. Chantal lies and says the priest spoke harshly to the Countess and tormented her to death. The Canon (who is the Count's uncle), the Count, and the Priest of Torcy all question the priest's conduct, but he only weakly defends himself and does not mention the letter of thanks the Countess sent him before she died, choosing to let his actions speak for themselves.

After the priest passes out one night and begins to intermittently hemorrhage blood, he decides to go to the city of Lille to see a doctor. Chantal visits him when he is packing and says the whole town thinks he is a drunk and her father is sure to have him transferred, but he maintains his composure.

In Lille, the doctor diagnoses the priest with stomach cancer. He visits Dufrety, a classmate from seminary who took a leave from the ministry after becoming sick and now works selling drugstore supplies and lives with a woman out of wedlock. The priest faints and ends up staying with Dufrety until he dies. Dufrety relates in a letter to the Priest of Torcy that the Priest of Ambricourt asked him for absolution shortly before dying and he complied, though not without communicating that he was not sure if it was appropriate. The priest's response to this were his last words: "What does it matter? All is Grace."

Cast

 Claude Laydu as Priest of Ambricourt (Curé d'Ambricourt)
 Léon Arvel as Fabregars
 Antoine Balpêtré as Dr. Delbende (Docteur Delbende)
 Jean Danet as Olivier
 Yvette Etiévant (credited as Jeanne Etiévant) as Cleaning Lady (Femme de ménage)
 Adrien Borel (credited as André Guibert) as Priest of Torcy (Curé de Torcy)
 Bernard Hubrenne as Abbot Dufréty (Abbé Dufréty)
 Nicole Ladmiral as Chantal
 Martine Lemaire as Séraphita Dumouchel
 Nicole Maurey as Miss Louise (Mlle Louise)
 Martial Morange as Deputy Mayor (L'Adjoint)
 Jean Riveyre as Count (Le Comte)
 Gaston Séverin as Canon (Le Chanoine)
 Gilberte Terbois as Madame Dumouchel (Mme Dumouchel)
 Rachel Bérendt (credited as Marie-Monique Arkell) as Countess (La Comtesse)

Production
At one point, screenwriters Jean Aurenche and Pierre Bost wrote an adaptation of the novel, but Georges Bernanos rejected their draft. Bresson did not write his screenplay until after Bernanos was dead, and said he "would have taken more liberties" if Bernanos had still been alive. While the film remains faithful to the spirit of the novel, Bresson strips the story bare with his exceptionally sober film style, to the degree that François Truffaut (who particularly admired the film) was likely employing understatement when he said the film had sound scenes that were "down-to-earth."

In the film, Bresson cast some non-professional actors, which is a practice he would expand upon in his subsequent films. His direction of these amateurs, who he referred to as "models", purposely constrained their movements and expressions, as he believed the performers' emotive lack would leave greater room for response in the audience. The models were often encouraged to empty themselves of intention by repeating a take until they lost all sense of the meaning of their actions and were simply moving or speaking "automatically".

The film was Bresson's first to utilize a complex soundtrack and voice-over narration. Its dialogue, which frequently consists of debates on spiritual and ethical matters, is complimented by voice-over commentary drawn from the diary after which the film is titled. Bresson stated that "an ice-cold commentary can warm, by contrast, tepid dialogues in a film. Phenomenon analogous to that of hot and cold in painting." Frequently, the commentary is intentionally redundant, with the priest informing the audience of an action that he has recently, or will shortly, complete on-screen.

Analysis
Throughout his filmography, Bresson was consistently captivated by characters that fall victim to an ineradicable idea or resolution, with Diary of a Country Priest being no exception. However, while his characters necessarily evidence motivated behaviors and decisions, Bresson scrupulously denied any hint of melodrama, and tried to minimize what he referred to as "psychologism" (meaning drama reducible to the intersection of its characters' personalities). Further, he aimed to preclude the insertion of any textual "value judgements" on the content of the film via the construction of its form. The resulting contemplative—perhaps even ascetic—formal distancing is meant to serve Bresson's overriding (Christian) spiritual concern, foregrounding ineffability and irreducible mystery, while nonetheless leaving room for grace.

Reception
Diary of a Country Priest was a financial success in France and established Bresson's international reputation as a major film director. Film critic André Bazin wrote an entire essay on the film, calling it a masterpiece "because of its power to stir the emotions, rather than the intelligence." Claude Laydu's debut performance in the title role has been described as one of the greatest in the history of film, with Jean Tulard writing in his Dictionary of Film that "No other actor deserves to go to heaven as much as Laydu."

On the review aggregator website Rotten Tomatoes, the film has a 95% approval rating based on 40 critics, with an average rating of 8.70/10; the site's "critics consensus" reads: "Diary of a Country Priest brilliantly captures one man's spiritual and religious journey -- and the striking next phase in the evolution of a major filmmaking talent." French journalist Frédéric Bonnaud praised Bresson's minimalist approach to the film's setting and argued: "For the first time in French cinema, the less the environment is shown, the more it resonates [...] ubiquitous and constant, persistent and unchanging, it doesn’t need to be shown: its evocation through sound is enough. It’s a veritable prison." John Simon of the National Review praised the film and regarded it as Bresson's best film. Armond White of the New York Press praised the film, noting that "Bresson exemplified 20th-century ecumenical intelligence that is much out of fashion today, yet remains singular and powerful."

Numerous filmmakers have expressed their admiration for the film. The Russian filmmaker Andrei Tarkovsky ranked the film at the top of a list of his ten favorite films. The Swedish filmmaker Ingmar Bergman was "extremely fond" of the film and called it "one of the strangest works ever made". The Austrian filmmaker Michael Haneke regards the film as one of his favorite of Bresson's films. The Portuguese filmmaker Pedro Costa included the film in his list of the top 10 films available from the Criterion Collection. American director Martin Scorsese said the film influenced his own Taxi Driver (1976), and Paul Schrader, who wrote the script for Taxi Driver, noted the film as a major influence when writing and directing his 2017 film First Reformed.

Awards
The film won eight international awards, including the Grand Prize at the Venice International Film Festival and the Prix Louis Delluc.

Notes

References

Sources

Further reading
 Tibbetts, John C., and James M. Welsh, eds. The Encyclopedia of Novels Into Film (2nd ed. 2005) pp 98–99.

External links
 
 
 
 
 Voted #11 on The Arts and Faith Top 100 Films (2010)
Diary of a Country Priest an essay by Frédéric Bonnaud at the Criterion Collection

1951 films
Existentialist films
Films with atheism-related themes
1951 drama films
French drama films
Louis Delluc Prize winners
Films directed by Robert Bresson
Films about Catholic priests
Films based on French novels
Films based on works by Georges Bernanos
French black-and-white films
1950s French-language films
1950s French films